Frank Höfle (also spelled Hoefle, born 22 November 1967) is a disabled German biathlete and cross-country skier. He first participated in the Winter Paralympic Games in 1984 and won his first medal, a gold, in 1988. He has competed in every Winter Paralympics since then until 2010, winning a total of 21 medals, 13 of them gold. He has competed in cycling at the Summer Paralympics twice, in 1992 and 1996, and won an additional one gold and two bronze medals.

See also
Athletes with most gold medals in one event at the Paralympic Games

References

External links
 

1967 births
Living people
People from Brackenheim
Sportspeople from Stuttgart (region)
Biathletes at the 1992 Winter Paralympics
Biathletes at the 1994 Winter Paralympics
Biathletes at the 1998 Winter Paralympics
Biathletes at the 2002 Winter Paralympics
Biathletes at the 2010 Winter Paralympics
Cross-country skiers at the 1984 Winter Paralympics
Cross-country skiers at the 1988 Winter Paralympics
Cross-country skiers at the 1992 Winter Paralympics
Cross-country skiers at the 1994 Winter Paralympics
Cross-country skiers at the 1998 Winter Paralympics
Cross-country skiers at the 2002 Winter Paralympics
Cross-country skiers at the 2006 Winter Paralympics
Cross-country skiers at the 2010 Winter Paralympics
Cyclists at the 1992 Summer Paralympics
Cyclists at the 1996 Summer Paralympics
German male biathletes
German male cross-country skiers
German male cyclists
Paralympic biathletes of Germany
Paralympic cross-country skiers of Germany
Paralympic cyclists of Germany
Paralympic bronze medalists for Germany
Paralympic gold medalists for Germany
Paralympic silver medalists for Germany
Cyclists from Baden-Württemberg
Medalists at the 2006 Winter Paralympics
Medalists at the 2002 Winter Paralympics
Medalists at the 1998 Winter Paralympics
Medalists at the 1994 Winter Paralympics
Medalists at the 1992 Winter Paralympics
Medalists at the 1988 Winter Paralympics
Medalists at the 1992 Summer Paralympics
Medalists at the 1996 Summer Paralympics
Paralympic medalists in cross-country skiing
Paralympic medalists in biathlon
Paralympic medalists in cycling
Recipients of the Order of Merit of Baden-Württemberg